Guillermo Gabriel Ocampo (born 19 May 1994) is an Argentine professional footballer who plays as a midfielder for Los Andes, on loan from Almirante Brown.

Career
Ocampo started out his senior career with Almirante Brown. Osvaldo Rodríguez selected Ocampo for his senior debut on 1 April 2015 versus Flandria in the Copa Argentina, which preceded him appearing in Primera B Metropolitana for the first time later that month against the same opponents. Two years later, in April 2017, Ocampo scored a brace in a victory away to San Telmo. He made his 100th career appearance on 23 February 2019 versus Sacachispas. On 17 February 2022, Ocampo joined Los Andes on a loan deal for the rest of 2022.

Career statistics
.

References

External links

1994 births
Living people
People from La Matanza Partido
Argentine footballers
Association football midfielders
Primera B Metropolitana players
Club Almirante Brown footballers
Club Atlético Los Andes footballers
Sportspeople from Buenos Aires Province
21st-century Argentine people